Kozman is a town in the Tavush Province of Armenia.

See also
 Tavush Province

References 

Populated places in Tavush Province